Zara in Iran may refer to:
Sohrab, Iran
Zarmeh